The 2019 Louisiana gubernatorial election was held to elect the governor of Louisiana. Incumbent Democratic Governor John Bel Edwards won re-election to a second term, defeating Republican businessman Eddie Rispone. Edwards became the first Democratic Governor of Louisiana to win re-election to a second consecutive term in 44 years since Edwin Edwards (no relation) in 1975. It was the closest Louisiana gubernatorial election since 1979.

Under Louisiana's jungle primary system, all candidates appear on the same ballot, regardless of party, and voters may vote for any candidate, regardless of their party affiliation. Because no candidate received an absolute majority of the vote during the primary election on October 12, 2019, a runoff election was held on November 16, 2019, between the top two candidates in the primary, Edwards and Rispone. Louisiana is the only state that has a jungle primary system (California and Washington have a similar top two primary system).

Background 
On Edwards’ Inauguration Day in 2015, State House Republicans, in a break with tradition, elected their own speaker, Representative Taylor Barras of New Iberia, over Edwards' choice, Representative Walt Leger of New Orleans. This move was said to be orchestrated by House GOP Chairman Lance Harris, who was considered a potential gubernatorial 2019 candidate and was a frequent Edwards critic. Edwards and Republican Legislative leaders repeatedly clashed over budget, tax and spending measures.

Attorney General Jeff Landry was perhaps Edwards' most prominent detractor, filing multiple lawsuits against the governor and frequently criticizing him in the media. The two disagreed the most on social policies, such as Landry's staunch opposition to Edwards' executive order providing protections for LGBT workers of state government and contractors. Landry also assumed the leadership of David Vitter's Political Action Committee, the Louisiana Committee for a Republican Majority, the organisation that was widely considered instrumental to Clay Higgins' upset Congressional victory over Scott Angelle in 2016. Landry has closely aligned with President Donald Trump and attended Trump's 2017 State of the Union speech.

Edwards also become a favorite target of U.S. Representative Garret Graves, a Republican from Baton Rouge and former aide to Governor Bobby Jindal. Graves frequently criticized the governor during the state's response to the 2016 August floods in the state. The two notably sparred during a hearing of the House Committee on Oversight and Government Reform, of which Graves is a member. Edwards' aides called the exchange a "political ambush" while Graves accused the governor of lying. Graves was also closely aligned with the Trump Administration and donated $300 to the Trump Inaugural fund. Graves also accompanied Vice President Mike Pence during a visit to parts of the Baton Rouge area in May 2017.

As the only Democratic Governor in the Deep South, Edwards and his agenda also been the target of numerous attacks from numerous groups affiliated with the national Republican Party such as America Rising and Americans for Prosperity. Edwards, declared himself to be unbothered by these groups, and went on to classify them as "a Washington, D.C., political action committee, trying to bring the never-ending campaign cycle to Louisiana."

Aware of their gubernatorial ambitions, Edwards and his aides repeatedly spoofed both U.S. senator John Neely Kennedy and Landry during their traditional response skits at Baton Rouge's Gridiron Show.

According to fundraising reports filed in 2016, Edwards had raised close to $3.3 million for his 2019 re-election effort. By comparison, Landry had $544,000 on hand for a potential future campaign. Graves and Kennedy had yet to form separate entities for statewide campaigns per Louisiana Law.

In the summer of 2017, Lieutenant Governor Billy Nungesser announced that he would not be a candidate for governor in 2019, and had decided to run for re-election. Nungesser said that he had disclosed his plans to run for re-election to then Governor-elect John Bel Edwards during his transition period. During the fall of 2017, U.S. Representative Ralph Abraham was reported to be running polls and assembling a staff to enter the race.

Democratic candidates

Advanced to the runoff
John Bel Edwards, incumbent Governor of Louisiana

Defeated in the jungle primary
Oscar Dantzler, former police officer and businessman

Disqualified
Vinny Mendoza, perennial candidate

Republican candidates

Advanced to the runoff
Eddie Rispone, construction executive and former chair of the Louisiana Workforce Investment Council

Defeated in the jungle primary
Ralph Abraham, U.S. Representative for Louisiana's 5th congressional district
Patrick Landry, artist and perennial candidate

Declined
Bret Allain, state senator
Conrad Appel, state senator
Charles Boustany, former U.S. Representative for Louisiana's 3rd congressional district and former U.S. Representative for Louisiana's 7th congressional district
John Fleming, former U.S. Representative for Louisiana's 4th congressional district
Garret Graves, incumbent U.S. Representative for Louisiana's 6th congressional district
Lance Harris, state representative and chairman of the Louisiana House Republican Caucus
Troy Hebert, former ATC Commissioner and state senator
Cameron Henry, state representative
Sharon Hewitt, state senator
John Kennedy, incumbent U.S. Senator
Jeff Landry, Attorney General of Louisiana
Billy Nungesser, incumbent Lieutenant Governor of Louisiana
Steve Scalise, incumbent U.S. Representative for Louisiana's 1st congressional district
John Schroder, Louisiana State Treasurer
Alan Seabaugh, state representative
Eric Skrmetta, Louisiana Public Service Commissioner

Disqualified
Patrick Douget
Manuel Russell Leach, contractor

Independents

Defeated in jungle primary
Gary Landrieu, businessman and perennial candidate

Declined

 John Georges, businessman and candidate for Governor of Louisiana in 2007

Jungle primary

Polling

with John Kennedy

Endorsements

Runoff

Debates

Predictions

Polling

with Ralph Abraham

with John Kennedy

with Jeff Landry

with Steve Scalise

with Generic Opponent

Results

Jungle primary 
According to the Louisiana Secretary of State more than 384,000 early votes were cast, a significant increase from the 2015 gubernatorial election in which 234,000 early votes were cast.

Runoff

See also 
2019 United States elections

Notes
Partisan clients

Additional candidates and polling key

References

External links
Official campaign websites
 John Bel Edwards (D) for Governor
 Eddie Rispone (R) for Governor

2019
Louisiana
2019 Louisiana elections
October 2019 events in the United States